The Cesarewitch is a greyhound racing competition held at Central Park Stadium. It was originally one of the classic races held in the British racing calendar and was inaugurated in 1928 and held at West Ham Stadium until its closure in 1972.

The event switched to Belle Vue Stadium until 1995 when it was transferred to Greyhound Racing Association (GRA) sister track Catford Stadium. The GRA closed Catford in 2000 and switched the Cesarewitch to their newly-acquired track Oxford Stadium. The event ended following the closure of Oxford in 2012.

In 2020, the competition was brought back by Entain and was held at their stadia of Romford and Crayford and sponsored by the company's brand Ladbrokes Coral as a category 1 race. It switched to Central Park in 2023.

Venues
1928-1971 (West Ham)
1972-1994 (Belle Vue)
1995-2000 (Catford)
2001-2012 (Oxford)
2020-2020 (Romford)
2021-2022 (Crayford)
2023-2023 (Central Park)

Sponsors
1976-1976 (Ladbrokes)
1989-1991 (Webster's Yorkshire Bitter)
1992-1994 (Fosters)
1995-2000 (William Hill)
2001-2001 (RD Racing Bookmakers)
2002-2009 (William Hill)
2010-2011 (Tech Shop UK)
2012-2012 (Mick Lowe)
2020-2022 (Ladbrokes Coral)
2023-2023 (Arena Racing Company)

Past winners

References

Greyhound racing competitions in the United Kingdom
Recurring sporting events established in 1928
Sport in Oxfordshire
Sport in the London Borough of Lewisham
Greyhound racing in London
Sport in the London Borough of Havering
Sports competitions in Manchester